Glympis concors is a species of moth in the family Erebidae.

The MONA or Hodges number for Glympis concors is 8478.

References

Further reading

 
 
 

Boletobiinae
Articles created by Qbugbot
Moths described in 1823